The Magic W3 is a 4.8" Windows®7 full OS touchscreen microcomputer with voice call functionality. The Magic W3 provides true windowed multitasking, multimedia entertainment, social network connectivity, navigation capability, voice telephony, and the full internet experience.  The device is assembled in Malaysia and is expected to be available in November, 2012 in China and Hong Kong, with plans underway to distribute it in other regions.

Specifications 
Processor
Intel Atom Z series 1.6 GHz

Operating System
Windows 7 Home Premium

Display
Touch Screen Size 4.8"
Resolution 800 x 480 WVGA native
800 x 600/1024 x 600 W/SVGA interpolated

RAM
1GB DDR2

Capacity
32 GB SSD

Network
GSM Quad Band
3.5G HSPA

Radio Connectivity
Wi-Fi b/g /n
GPS Transceiver

Dimensions / Weight
141 x 81.5 x 23 mm / 270 g

Battery
3200 mAh 3.7V

2.0 MP Camera (Video Conferencing)
Accelerometer
Vibrate Alert

Peripheral Connectivity
Mini HDMI
Mini USB
Micro SD
SIM Card Slot
Charging & Docking I/O
3.5mm Jack Connector

Audio
Dual Mics
Receiver
Stereo Speakers

Hardware Interface
Volume Control +/- buttons
Call Key
End Key
Power Switch - Sleep/Standby, Screen/Key Lock

Applications (Apps) 
MAGIC Telephony Touch UI
Phone Dialer
Messaging
Call History
Contacts
Microsoft Windows Live Essentials
Microsoft Office Starter

Other Applications Not Supplied
Adobe Flash
Netflix
iTunes
Photoshop
Windows Media Center
Winamp
World of Warcraft
Millions of other Windows applications

References

External links 
 Magic W3 official site
 Magic W3 review - Worlds First...
 Magic W3 review - Engadget
 Magic W3 review - Slashgear video demos
 Magic W3 distributors in China and Hong Kong - China Media Group Corporation(Public, OTC:CHMD)
 Magic W3 review - enterprise market

Microcomputers